Julie Keegan is a  female Australian international lawn bowls player.

Bowls career
In 2008, she won the gold medal in the fours and silver medal in the triples at the 2008 World Championships. Two years later she won a silver medal at the 2010 Commonwealth Games in the Women's triples event.

In addition she has won three medals at Asia Pacific Championships. In 2007 a triples silver and fours bronze and in 2009 a triples silver. Keegan had played in over 100 test matches for Australia. Keegan has won the Hong Kong International Bowls Classic pairs title twice, twice (with Kelsey Cottrell) in 2009 and 2010.

In 2019 she won the Australian National Bowls Championships pairs with Katelyn Inch.

Awards
In 2011 she was one of two finalists for Bowls Australia’s female bowler of the year, and in 2010 she was nominated for Hyundai Queensland Sportswoman of the year award.

Personal life
Keegan is married with two children and lives on the Gold Coast in Queensland, Australia.

References 

1964 births
Living people
Commonwealth Games gold medallists for Australia
Bowls players at the 2010 Commonwealth Games
Australian female bowls players
People from the Sunshine Coast, Queensland
Sportswomen from Queensland
Commonwealth Games medallists in lawn bowls
Bowls World Champions
21st-century Australian women
Medallists at the 2010 Commonwealth Games